Collier High School is a private, nonsectarian high school located in the Wickatunk section of Marlboro Township, in Monmouth County, New Jersey, United States. The school serves students with emotional difficulties and other special needs.  The house and property were given to the Sisters of the Good Shepherd with the express purpose to create a residential program for girls with problem situations. The school was transferred to the sisters in 1927 by Sara Steward Collier-Van Allen. Although privately operated by the Sisters of the Good Shepherd, the school receives a portion of its funding from public school districts which pay tuition for their students to be placed at Collier High School.

As of the 2015–16 school year, the school had an enrollment of 181 students and 47.3 classroom teachers (on an FTE basis), for a student–teacher ratio of 3.8:1. The school's student body was 79.6% White, 8.3% Hispanic, 6.1% Black, 3.3% Native Hawaiian / Pacific Islander, 1.1% Asian and 1.7% two or more races.

History
Originally called "St. Dorothy's School for Girls at Rest Hill" and envisioned as a girls' residential facility, the school now accepts both girls and boys.

In the agreement of property transfer, Mrs. Collier retained a suite in the house until her death in 1963 and kept close touch with the school and its needs.

The first capitol improvement to the property was the addition of Smith Hall, a girls' dormitory. Next, a wing was added to the main house with a chapel and activity rooms. Then a separate school building was constructed.

References

External links
Collier High School

Marlboro Township, New Jersey
Private high schools in Monmouth County, New Jersey